Federal Route 273, or Jalan Dato' Syed Omar, is a major federal road in Kuah town, Langkawi Island, Kedah, Malaysia. It was named after Dato' Syed Omar, the former Menteri Besar (Chief Minister) of Kedah. Kilometre Zero  is located at Langkawi Island Resort and Golf Club.

Features

Most sections of Federal Route 273 were built under the JKR R5 road standard, allowing a maximum speed limit of up to 90 km/h.

List of junctions and town

References

Malaysian Federal Roads
Roads in Langkawi